William Burgoyne Taverner  (16 August 1879 – 17 July 1958) was a New Zealand Member of Parliament for the United Party, and Mayor of Dunedin.

Member of Parliament 

Taverner represented the Dunedin electorate of Dunedin South from 1928 to 1931 for the United Party, when he was defeated by Fred Jones.

Under Joseph Ward, he was Minister of Railways (1928–1930), Minister of Customs (1928–1929), and Commissioner of State Forests (1928–1930). Under George Forbes, he was Minister of Public Works (1930–1931), and Minister of Transport (1930–1931).

Mayor and city councillor 
Taverner was one of Dunedin's longest serving city councillors and was the mayor of Dunedin from 1927 to 1929. In 1935, he was awarded the King George V Silver Jubilee Medal. He was appointed an Officer of the Order of the British Empire in the 1953 New Year Honours, for services to the community.

Notes

References

|-

1879 births
1958 deaths
Members of the New Zealand House of Representatives
New Zealand Liberal Party MPs
Members of the Cabinet of New Zealand
Mayors of Dunedin
New Zealand MPs for Dunedin electorates
New Zealand Officers of the Order of the British Empire
Unsuccessful candidates in the 1931 New Zealand general election